The Autostrada A23 is an Italian motorway, which connects the A4 motorway (Turin–Trieste) near Palmanova via Udine to Tarvisio and the Austrian Süd Autobahn (A2).

Part of the European route E55, the toll road is one of the main transport links between Northeast Italy and Central Europe.

See also
 Autostrade of Italy

References

Buildings and structures completed in 1966
Autostrade in Italy
Transport in Friuli-Venezia Giulia